The following is a list of county routes in Hunterdon County in the U.S. state of New Jersey.  For more information on the county route system in New Jersey as a whole, including its history, see County routes in New Jersey.

500-series county routes
In addition to those listed below, the following 500-series county routes serve Hunterdon County:
CR 512, CR 513, CR 514, CR 517, CR 518, CR 519, CR 523, and CR 579

Other county routes

See also

References

 
Hunterdon